KXLL is a non-commercial adult album alternative/modern rock hybrid music radio station in Juneau, Alaska, broadcasting on 100.7 FM.

History
Capital Community Broadcasting, Inc. purchased KXLL and KSRJ from White Oak Broadcasting of Alaska in 2006.

History of call letters
The call letters KXLL previously were used by an AM station in Missoula, Montana. It operated on 1450 kHz with 250 W power (unlimited).

References

External links
Official site
Listen Live

XLL
Adult album alternative radio stations in the United States
Modern rock radio stations in the United States
NPR member stations
Radio stations established in 1985
1985 establishments in Alaska